Panazol is a commune in the Haute-Vienne department in the Nouvelle-Aquitaine region in west-central France. It is an eastern suburb of Limoges.

Panazol is the third largest town in the department (by population), after Limoges and Saint-Junien. It can be considered as a commuter town.

Theo Sarapo, the singer, actor, and second husband of Édith Piaf died at Limoges on
August 28, 1970 on RD 941 at the Panazol exit, direction Saint-Léonard-de-Noblat (Haute-Vienne). His car, a blue Citroen ID19, left the road at high speed and struck a tree the approximate height of Chateau de la Rue. He was removed from the wreckage and rushed to the Limoges hospital, where he died as a result of his injuries at the age of 34. He was buried in Paris at Père-Lachaise cemetery alongside Édith Piaf.

Population
Inhabitants are known as Panazolais.

See also
Communes of the Haute-Vienne department

References

Communes of Haute-Vienne